Willie Anderson may refer to:

 Willie Anderson (golfer) (1879–1910), Scottish golfer
 Willie Anderson (rugby union, born 1955), rugby union coach and former Ireland international
 Willie Anderson (rugby union, born 1967), Scotland rugby union player
 Willie Anderson (American football) (born 1975), American football player
 Willie Anderson (basketball) (born 1967), former professional basketball player and 1988 Olympic bronze medalist
 Willie Anderson (footballer) (born 1947), former Portland Timbers NASL soccer player
 Willie "Flipper" Anderson (born 1965), American football player

See also
 William Anderson (disambiguation)